Massachusetts House of Representatives' 16th Middlesex district in the United States is one of 160 legislative districts included in the lower house of the Massachusetts General Court. It covers part of Middlesex County. Democrat Tom Golden of Lowell has represented the district since 2003.

Locales represented
The district includes the following localities:
 part of Chelmsford
 part of Lowell

The current district geographic boundary overlaps with those of the Massachusetts Senate's 1st Middlesex and 3rd Middlesex districts.

Former locale
The district previously covered Framingham, circa 1872.

Representatives
 Benj. H. Richardson, circa 1858 
 Benjamin W. Gleason, circa 1859 
 Charles Q. Pierce, circa 1888 
 Thomas J. Corbett, circa 1920 
 Robert F. Murphy, circa 1951 
 William R. Callahan, 1971-1972 
 Edward J. Markey, 1973-1974 
 Richard J. McGrath, 1975-1976 
 A. Joseph DeNucci, 1977-1978 
 Bruce N. Freeman, 1979-1986 
 Carol C. Cleven, 1987–1988, 1991-2002 
 Henry E. Sultivan, 1989-1990 
 Thomas Golden Jr., 2003-current

See also
 List of Massachusetts House of Representatives elections
 List of Massachusetts General Courts
 List of former districts of the Massachusetts House of Representatives
 Other Middlesex County districts of the Massachusetts House of Representatives: 1st, 2nd, 3rd, 4th, 5th, 6th, 7th, 8th, 9th, 10th, 11th, 12th, 13th, 14th, 15th, 17th, 18th, 19th, 20th, 21st, 22nd, 23rd, 24th, 25th, 26th, 27th, 28th, 29th, 30th, 31st, 32nd, 33rd, 34th, 35th, 36th, 37th

Images
Portraits of legislators

References

External links
 Ballotpedia. Massachusetts House of Representatives Sixteenth Middlesex District
  (State House district information based on U.S. Census Bureau's American Community Survey).

House
Government of Middlesex County, Massachusetts